Abderrazak Rassaa (4 January 1930 – 7 January 2020) was a Tunisian politician.

Biography
Rassaa started out as a French professor at Lycée Carnot de Tunis in Tunis. After this teaching stint he became CEO of the Banque de Tunisie. From 1958 to 1964, he served on the board of directors of the Central Bank of Tunisia. Rassaa became Minister of Industry in 1968 and Minister of Finance the following year, where he served until 1971.

Abderrazak Rassaa died on 7 January 2020 at the age of 90.

References

2020 deaths
1930 births
Finance ministers of Tunisia
Socialist Destourian Party politicians